Peter Emmerich (born November 5, 1973) is an acclaimed illustrator having an extensive relationship with The Walt Disney Co.

Early Life and Career
He was born in New York City, raised in Brooklyn and attended Xaverian High School, and then The Fashion Institute of Technology. Upon graduating from The Fashion Institute of Technology he began his career with The Walt Disney Co. as a character artist for Walt Disney Consumer Products. He worked there for over two years before being promoted to Chief Illustrator and Official Character Artist for the Disneyland Resort. While he was there, he created a great number of successful collector lithographs including Disneyland's 45th Anniversary "Character of the Month" series. In 2001, he created an image that has become one of The Walt Disney Company's most iconic images: "Mickey Salutes America". It quickly became one of the fastest-selling posters ever created for The Walt Disney Co. and the poster publisher, Bruce Mcgaw Graphics, Inc. in Nyack, New York.

Due to the success of that image, Emmerich was chosen to create a series of postage stamps for the United States Postal Service highlighting images and characters from famous Disney films. The series of twelve stamps would include three sections titled The Art of Disney: Friendship, The Art of Disney: Celebration, The Art of Disney: Romance. These stamps feature many well known and loved Disney characters including Mickey Mouse, Donald Duck, Goofy, Cinderella, and The Lion King to name a few. These stamps are in the top twenty best selling stamps of all time.

Emmerich has taught at The Pratt Institute and currently teaches at The Fashion Institute of Technology.

He  lives and works in Yonkers, NY.

References

External links
Peter Emmerich Illustration
The Disney Blog: Peter Emmerich

1973 births
Living people
American animators
American cartoonists
Fashion Institute of Technology faculty